Acanthoceras may refer to:

 Acanthoceras (alga), a genus of alga
 Acanthoceras (ammonite), extinct cephalopod genus that lived in the Late Cretaceous